A Mefo bill (sometimes written as MEFO bill), named after the company Metallurgische Forschungsgesellschaft (Metallurgical Research Corporation), was a promissory note used for a system of deferred payment to finance the Nazi German government's programme of rearmament, devised by the German Central Bank President, Hjalmar Schacht, in 1934.

Mefo bills followed the scheme for which the Öffa bills were the blueprint.

As Germany was rearming against the terms of the Treaty of Versailles, they needed a way to fund rearming without leaving a paper trail; Schacht created this system as a temporary method to fund rearming with only one million Reichsmarks in capital.  Schacht later said that the device "enabled the Reichsbank to lend by a subterfuge to the Government what it normally or legally could not do".

Funding rearmament
The German government needed to spend a large amount of money to fund the Depression-era reconstruction of its heavy industry based economy and, ultimately, its re-armament industry. However, it faced two problems. First, rearmament was illegal under the terms of the Treaty of Versailles, and secondly there was a legal interest rate limit of 4.5%.

The government would normally borrow extra funds on the money market by offering a higher interest rate. However, because of the limit it was unable to do so. Additionally, a large, visible government deficit would have attracted attention.

An imaginary company
Hjalmar Schacht formed the limited liability company Metallurgische Forschungsgesellschaft, m.b.H., or "MEFO" for short. The company's "Mefo bills" served as bills of exchange, convertible into Reichsmark upon demand. MEFO had no actual existence or operations and was solely a balance sheet entity. The bills were mainly issued as payment to armaments manufacturers.

Mefo bills were issued to last for six months initially, but with the provision for indefinite ninety-day extensions. To further entice investors, Mefo bills carried an annual interest rate of 4%, which was higher than that of other trade bills at the
time.

To make sure that the bills were never exchanged for Reichsmarks, which would lead to inflation, the ninety-day maturation period for
the bills kept being extended until the actual maturation period became five years by 1939.  The total amount of Mefo bills issued was kept secret.

Essentially, Mefo bills enabled the German Reich to run a greater deficit than it would normally have been able to. By 1938, there were 12 billion Reichsmark of Mefo bills, compared to 19 billion of normal government bonds.

This enabled the German government to re-inflate their economy, which culminated in its eventual rearmament.

Fueling growth
This strengthened the German economy by providing the government with various goods and services which it was then able to reinvest in the economy, fueling its growth, and preparing it for Hitler's aggressive foreign and domestic policies. Not only did the bills serve the above functions, but they also concealed the military expenditure forbidden by the Treaty of Versailles.

References

External links
Nuremberg Trials discussion of the mefo bill
 Nazi Conspiracy & Aggression Individual Responsibility Of Defendants, the Nizkor Project

Payment systems
Economy of Nazi Germany